Bath County is a county located in the U.S. state of Kentucky. As of the 2020 census, the population was 12,750. The county seat is Owingsville. The county was formed in 1811. Bath County is included in the Mount Sterling, KY Micropolitan Statistical Area, which is also included in the Lexington-Fayette-Richmond-Frankfort, KY Combined Statistical Area.

History
Bath County was established in 1811 from land given by Montgomery County, Kentucky. Its name is derived from natural springs said to have medicinal qualities. The courthouse in Owingsville was destroyed by an accidental fire caused by Union troops during the American Civil War in 1864.

In 1932, an archaeological field survey observed fourteen archaeological sites in Bath County, including the Ramey Mound near Sharpsburg and multiple ancient burials near the Springfield Presbyterian Church.

Geography

Adjacent counties
 Fleming County  (north)
 Rowan County  (east)
 Menifee County  (southeast)
 Montgomery County  (southwest)
 Bourbon County  (west)
 Nicholas County  (northwest)

National protected area
 Daniel Boone National Forest (part)

Demographics

As of the census of 2000, there were 11,085 people, 4,445 households, and 3,195 families residing in the county. The racial makeup of the county was 96.87% White, 1.85% Black or African American, 0.21% Native American, 0.02% Asian, 0.40% from other races, and 0.66% from two or more races.  0.80% of the population were Hispanic or Latino of any race.

There were 4,445 households, out of which 32.30% had children under the age of 18 living with them, 57.70% were married couples living together, 10.30% had a female householder with no husband present, and 28.10% were non-families. 25.30% of all households were made up of individuals, and 12.00% had someone living alone who was 65 years of age or older.  The average household size was 2.47 and the average family size was 2.93.

In the county, the population was spread out, with 24.20% under the age of 18, 8.60% from 18 to 24, 28.80% from 25 to 44, 23.80% from 45 to 64, and 14.60% who were 65 years of age or older.  The median age was 37 years. For every 100 females, there were 97.60 males.  For every 100 females age 18 and over, there were 94.80 males.

The median income for a household in the county was $26,018, and the median income for a family was $31,758. Males had a median income of $27,786 versus $20,986 for females. The per capita income for the county was $15,326.  About 16.40% of families and 21.90% of the population were below the poverty line, including 29.60% of those under age 18 and 21.20% of those age 65 or over.

Politics

Throughout the 20th century, Bath County was overwhelmingly Democratic, only voting the other way in the Republican landslides of 1928, 1972, and 1984. However, in 2000, George W. Bush flipped the county into the Republican column. Bath County was one of the few counties in Kentucky to flip from Bush to Kerry in 2004. Despite Barack Obama's indomitable midwestern strength in 2008, Bath County was one of the small number of counties to flip from Kerry to McCain that year, although Obama lost it very narrowly. Now, like the rest of the counties in coal country, Bath county votes Republican in presidential elections; Donald Trump won over two-thirds of the vote here in 2016.

Despite the Republican devotion in presidential elections, Bath County still retains loyalty to local Democrats, as they voted for Andy Beshear over Matt Bevin in the 2019 gubernatorial election. Bath County has not voted for a Republican gubernatorial candidate since 1919.

Voter Registration

Statewide Elections

Communities
 Owingsville (county seat)
 Salt Lick
 Sharpsburg

See also

 Dry counties
 National Register of Historic Places listings in Bath County, Kentucky
 Preston, Kentucky
 List of counties in Kentucky

References

External links
 The Kentucky Highlands Project
 About Bath County

 
1811 establishments in Kentucky
Populated places established in 1811
Kentucky counties
Mount Sterling, Kentucky micropolitan area
Counties of Appalachia